D610 may refer to:
 Nikon D610, a full-frame digital single-lens reflex camera
 Dell Latitude D610, a laptop computer